Minya Governorate is one of the governorates of Upper Egypt. Its capital city, Minya, is located on the left bank of the Nile River.

Etymology
The name originates from the chief city of the governorate, originally known in Sahidic Coptic as Tmoone and in Bohairic as Thmonē, meaning “the residence”, in reference to a monastery formerly in the area. The name may also originate from the city's name in Egyptian Men'at Khufu.

Overview
The rate of poverty is more than 60% in this governorate, where the total population is nearly 6 million. Recently the government has provided some assistance via social safety networks, specifically, some financial assistance to residents with disabilities, and job opportunities for them and others. The funding has been coordinated by the country's Ministry of Finance and with assistance from international organizations.

Municipal divisions
The governorate is divided into municipal divisions with a total estimated population as of March 2019 of 5,807,919. In the case of Minya governorate, there are a number of aqsam and marakiz, and a new city.  Sometimes a markaz and a kism share a name.

Cities and towns
As of 2018, 10 cities (or towns) in Minya had a population of over 15,000 inhabitants.

Population
According to population estimates from 2015 the majority of residents in the governorate live in rural areas, with an urbanization rate of only 18.9%. Out of an estimated 5,566,702 people residing in the governorate, 4,683,284 people live in rural areas as opposed to only 979,418 in urban areas.

History

Little is known today about Minya Governorate compared to its great wealth of archaeological sites. Its history, including Ancient Egyptian, Hellenistic, Roman and Arab periods, has not yet received the full attention of scholars.

Ancient Egyptian period
Dehnet, Fraser Tombs, Sharuna, and Zawyet el-Maiyitin comprise monuments dating back to the Old Kingdom.

The village of Bani Hasan al Shurruq houses 390 rock-cut decorated tombs and chapels from the Middle Kingdom (2000–1580 BC, especially the sixteenth dynasty). The Speos Artemidos is nearby, and hosts temples built by Queen Hatshepsut.

Akhetaten was built by Pharaoh Akhenaten and dedicated to the god Aten. Akhenaten lived there in isolation with his wife, Nefertiti, and daughters, devoting himself to the monotheistic religion that he preached. The glorious remains of the palaces, temples and tombs still exist today.

Other significant archaeological sites in the governorate of Minya include Deir Abu Hinis, Deir el-Bersha, El-Sheikh Sa'id, and Tuna el-Gebel.

Greco-Roman period
El Ashmunein (Hermopolis Magna) was the capital of the region during this period. It was the main center of worship of the god Thoth. Today, the ruins of a Greek temple, similar to the Parthenon, can be still found.

The tomb and chapel of Petosiris are found near the modern village of Tuna el-Gebel.

Antinoöpolis was built in 130 A.D. by the Roman emperor Hadrian in memory of his favourite and eromenos Antinous.

Byzantine period
The Monastery of the Virgin Mary at Gebel el-Teir is an important Christian site near the city of Samalut. Its church was built by Empress Helena, mother of Constantine the Great, in 328, on one of the sites where the Holy Family is believed to have stayed during its Flight into Egypt.

Oxyrhynchus was an important administrative center during the Hellenistic Period, and remains an important archaeological source for papyri from the Byzantine Egypt.

Arab period
Maghagha hosts the mosque of the famous Muslim Zayid ibn al Mugharah.

Modern history
Today, Minya Governorate has the highest concentration of Coptic Christians of 50% of the total population. There are also a number of active monasteries in the region.

In 2018, a Coptic cathedral was consecrated by Pope Tawadros II in the small village of Al Ur, near Samalut. The new cathedral was dedicated to the 21 Coptic Martyrs of Libya, thirteen of whom were from Al Ur.

Archaeology 
In February 2019, fifty mummy collections wrapped in linen, stone coffins or wooden sarcophagi dated back to the Ptolemaic Kingdom were discovered by Egyptian archaeologists in the Tuna El-Gebel site. 12 of the graves in four burial chambers 9m (30ft) deep, belonged to children. One of the remains was the partly uncovered skull enclosed in linen.

In May 2020, Egyptian-Spanish archaeological mission headed by Esther Ponce revealed a unique cemetery consist of one room built with glazed limestone dating back to the 26th Dynasty (so-called the El-Sawi era) at the site of  ancient Oxyrhynchus. Archaeologists also uncovered bronze coins, clay seals, Roman tombstones and small crosses.

Projects

In 1981, the Basic Village Service Program (BVS) of USAID, had several water, and road projects, going on in several markazes in the Minya Governorate.
In 2013, The United Nations Trust Fund for Human Security helped farmers in Minya by doing consultation work with them and taking soil samples.

National holiday
The national holiday of the Minya governorate is on 18 March. It commemorates those who were executed by the British at Deir Mawas on 18 March 1919.

Industrial zones
According to the Egyptian Governing Authority for Investment and Free Zones (GAFI), in affiliation with the Ministry of Investment (MOI), the following industrial zones are located in this governorate:
 Al Matahra, east of the Nile
 Heavy industrial zone - Wadi el Sararyah
 New Minya

Agriculture and industry

Minya Governorate is an important agricultural and industrial region. Among its principal crops are sugarcane, cotton, beans, soybeans, garlic, onions, vegetables of various sorts, tomatoes, potatoes, watermelons, and grapes. Among the leading local industries are food processing (especially sugar and the drying and grinding of onions), spinning and weaving of cotton, perfumes, oils and fats, cement-making, quarrying (especially limestone), and brick-making.

Important sites
 Akhetaten (Amarna)
 Dehenet (Akoris or Tihna el-Gebel)
 Ansena (Antinoöpolis or Sheikh Ibada)
 Beni Hasan
 Deir el-Bersha
 el-Sheikh Sa'id
 Fraser Tombs
 Hatnub
 Hebenu (Kom el-Ahmar)
 Herwer (Hur)
 Khmun (Hermopolis Magna or el-Ashmunein)
 Per Medjed (Oxyrhynchus or el-Bahnasa)
 Sharuna (el-Kom el-Ahmar Sawaris)
 Speos Artemidos (Istabl Antar)
 Tuna el-Gebel
 Zawyet el-Maiyitin

Monasteries in the Minya Governorate
Monastery of Saint Fana, near Mallawi

Notable people
 Abdel Hakim Amer, military general
 Akhenaten, Pharaoh of the Eighteenth dynasty
 Akram Habib, Biblical scholar and social activist
 Hakim, folkloric singer
 Hoda Shaarawi, female activist
 Khufu, second Pharaoh of the Fourth dynasty
 Louis Awad, writer and intellectual
 Maria al-Qibtiyya, wife of Muhammad
 Sanaa Gamil, actress
 Suzanne Mubarak, the former first lady of Egypt
 Taha Hussein, writer and intellectual
 Mervat Amin, artist
 Ahmed Hassan, leader of Egyptian Football Team
 Alla Mohammed Hassan Limt , Musician

Statistics
 Total area: 32,279 km².
 Percentage to total area of Egypt: 3.2%.
 Population: around 5.8 million
 Population density: 115 people/km²
 Rural population:
 Percentage to the whole population of Egypt: 5.1%
 Population growth rate:
 Minya Governorate administrative divisions: 9 localities, 57 local administrative units, 346 small villages, and 1,429 tiny villages.

See also
 2016 Minya pogrom

Sources
 The Egyptian Tourist Authority, - ETA.

References

External links

 El Wattan News of Minya Governorate 
 Minya University web page.

 
Governorates of Egypt